The 2002 Sukma Games, officially known as the 9th Sukma Games, was a Malaysian multi-sport event held in Sabah from 7 to 14 September 2002. Perakian gymnast Ng Shu Mun, Kuala Lumpurian athlete Ngew Sin Mei and Negeri Sembilan athlete Petra Nabila Mustafa were announced as Best Sportsman, Best Sportswoman and Most Promising Sportswoman of the event respectively.

Development and preparation
The 9th Sukma Games Organising Committee chaired by Chief Minister of Sabah, Chong Kah Kiat was formed to oversee the staging of the event.

Venues
The 9th Sukma Games had 19 venues for the games.

Marketing

Logo

The logo of the 2002 Sukma Games is an athlete in action. The circle represents the national integration through sports, the blue line that resembles the Mount Kinabalu represents the skill of the participating athletes, the yellow circle that resembles the sun represents hope and determination of athletes to succeed, while the red S represents the fighting spirit and energy of the athlete, the Sukma Games and Sabah itself and the colours on the logo represents Sabah as the state of Malaysia.

Mascot
The Mascot of the 2002 Sukma Games is a Proboscis monkey named Bayau. It is said that the Proboscis monkey is a reddish-brown arboreal Old World monkey that is endemic to the south-east Asian island of Borneo. In Sabah, it can be found in Sukau, Sg. Segama, Klias and other places in small population. Apart from having a large body size, it can swing fast from tree to tree and swimming. The adoption of the proboscis monkey is to promote eco-tourism and to create awareness about the animal.

Songs
The theme song of the 2002 Sukma Games is "Gemilang Di Alaf Baru" which means, Glory in the New Century and is eponymous to the games theme.

The games

Participating states

 
 
 
 
 
 
 
 
 
 
 
 
 
 
 
  Schools
  Universities
  Police

Sports

 Aquatics

Medal table

Broadcasting
Radio Televisyen Malaysia was responsible for live streaming of several events, opening and closing ceremony of the games.

References

External links
 2002 Sukma Games official website

Sukma Games
2002 in multi-sport events
Sukma